Z Channel: A Magnificent Obsession is a 2004 documentary film about Los Angeles pay cable channel Z Channel which was directed by Xan Cassavetes, daughter of Hollywood director and actor John Cassavetes. It was screened out of competition at the 2004 Cannes Film Festival.

The documentary is about Z Channel, which was one of the first pay cable TV stations in the United States. Z Channel became famous for showing an eclectic variety of films, including foreign language, silent, documentary, director's cut, forgotten, overlooked, under-appreciated, erotic as well as mainstream films, without commercials and uncut and letterboxed when possible.

The film also tells the story of Z Channel's programming director Jerry Harvey who was a true film lover, programming genius, and a man almost single-handedly responsible for getting many great films shown to the public. It gives insights into Harvey's constant battle with personal demons which resulted in him ending his own life and the life of his wife in a murder-suicide.

Throughout the film a variety of footage featuring some of the films shown on the Z Channel is used. This serves to underline the diversity offered on the channel in particular its attempts to expose its American viewers to undubbed foreign language films.

The films ends with a montage of scenes of such films with Irving Berlin's "What'll I Do?" theme being played over the top of them as performed by the actor William Atherton from the film The Great Gatsby (1974).

People interviewed for the film
Robert Altman
Alexander Payne
Quentin Tarantino
Jacqueline Bisset
Theresa Russell 
Jim Jarmusch
Stuart Cooper
F. X. Feeney
Penelope Spheeris 
James Woods
Henry Jaglom 
Vilmos Zsigmond 
James B. Harris

Selected films featured on Z Channel
Heaven's Gate
Once Upon a Time in America
Overlord
Pat Garrett and Billy The Kid
McCabe and Mrs. Miller
Das Boot
The Wild Bunch
The Leopard
1900
That Most Important Thing: Love
Ride the High Country 
Salvador
Black Orpheus
Paths of Glory
My Darling Clementine

Reception
Z Channel has an overall approval rating of 100% on Rotten Tomatoes.

At Metacritic, the film scored 85/100 based on 4 critics.

Home media
The film was released to DVD in 2004 as a 2-disc special edition, which included numerous bonus features. A standard 1-disc edition followed in 2005.

It is available on Shout! Cult June 2022.

See also
Cinephilia
2004 in film
The Snob's Dictionary-The channel mentioned in the Film Snob edition

References

External links 
 
 
 Promo on YouTube
Z Channel: A Magnificent Obsession on ShoutFactoryTV

2004 television films
2004 films
2004 documentary films
American independent films
American documentary films
Documentary films about television
Documentary films about films
Documentary films about mental health
Documentary films about suicide
Documentary films about Los Angeles
Documentary films about fandom
Film and video fandom
Documentary films about mass media people
2004 independent films
2000s English-language films
2000s American films